Temnoye is a rural locality (a village) in Chernushinsky District, Perm Krai, Russia. The population was 83 as of 2010. There are 5 streets.

Geography 
Temnoye is located 26 km southeast of Chernushka (the district's administrative centre) by road. Agarzinsky is the nearest rural locality.

References 

Rural localities in Chernushinsky District